Platyptilia ardua is a moth of the family Pterophoridae. It is found in North America, including Washington and British Columbia.

References

Moths described in 1927
ardua